A vlieger is a type of sleeveless over-gown or cape worn by women in the late 16th and early 17th centuries. Variations with short sleeves or high shoulder rolls are known. Sometimes sleeves were attached with aiglets, and often slits were made to allow belts or the hands to pass through.

In the Netherlands the vlieger was often worn with a millstone collar (a wide starched ruff). The vlieger was always worn with a skirt with a fardegalijn. In cold weather it could be buttoned shut, though the Spanish version, called a "ropa" could only be closed at the neck.

The Spanish version was called a "ropa" and the French version was called a "marlotte".

References

Robes and cloaks
16th-century fashion
17th-century fashion